HD 107148 is an 8th magnitude primary of the binary star system located approximately 161 light years away in the constellation of Virgo. It is a yellow dwarf with a luminosity 1.41 times the Sun. It is twice as enriched with heavy elements than the Sun. The HD 107148 exhibits a magnetic activity cycle with a period around 6 years.

In 2012, a comoving white dwarf stellar companion HD 107148 B was detected at projected separation of 1790 AU, and was confirmed in 2014. It is a 0.6  remnant core of the former 1.8  star.

Planetary system
In 2006, a discovery of Saturn-mass planet was announced. Another Neptune-sized planet was discovered in 2021, together with significantly refined orbit of HD 107148 b. 

HD 107148 should not be confused with HD 108147, which also has an extrasolar planet located in Crux constellation discovered in 2000.

See also
 List of extrasolar planets

References

G-type main-sequence stars
107148
060081
Virgo (constellation)
Planetary systems with two confirmed planets
BD−02 3497
J12191349-0319112
Binary stars